Glowinthedark (stylised as GLOWINTHEDARK) is a Dutch DJ and record production duo from The Hague, consisting of Albert Harvey (born 1986) and Kevin Ramos (born 1987).

Biography
Albert Harvey and Kevin Ramos both grew up in the Netherlands.

Albert learned how to play piano at the age of 8. When he was 17 he started producing. He studied ‘Music Production’ at the Albeda College in Schiedam and started DJing at clubs when he was 20.

Kevin's father was a Latin singer and his mother a soul and funky jazz singer. When he was 14 he played at small parties and celebrations, two years later he started playing in clubs.

Fashion 
Besides making music, Glowinthedark is working on a fashion line containing clothes, accessories and a DJ-bag.

Career 

In 2010, Glowinthedark released their first single; "Electronic Life" on Döner Digital Records, a collaboration with Jody Meyer.

A few months after the release of their first single, they released The Battalion EP together with Jack Ferreira, this EP contained the tracks "Morscode", "Juggernaut" and "Go Fast".

Two months later the duo released a song on DJ Chuckie's label Dirty Dutch Music; "Jump".

In 2011, Glowinthedark produced a remix of DJ Chuckie's track "Who Is Ready to Jump", in April 2012 they teamed up and released "Electro Dude".
In 2013 Glowinthedark made the official anthem for Dirty Dutch Aftershock; "Say Whoo".

In June 2013, "Ain't a Party" was released on David Guetta's label Jack Back Records.
The track is featured on the F*ck Me I’m Famous Ibiza 2013 Mix by David Guetta.

On 23 December 2013, a song with DJ Chuckie was released on Spinnin’ Records; "NRG".
A few weeks later on 10 January 2014 Glowinthedark and Ben Saunders, the winner of The Voice Of Holland, released "What You Do" on 8ball Music.

On 17 February 2014, Glowinthedark released their collaboration with Alvaro on Powerhouse Music, "Charged".

Alongside producing music, Glowinthedark performs at events in the Netherlands and overseas.
Since 2011 they’ve been resident DJs at Blue Marlin Ibiza  and Beach Club Bloomingdale in Bloemendaal. In the summer of 2013 GLOWINTHEDARK had their first residency at Pacha Ibiza, in the same year they joined the Pacha World Tour, a tour initiated by Pacha across all similar named clubs in the world.
Some other events and venues where Glowinthedark has performed are: Mysteryland, Tomorrowland, the Amsterdam dance event and the Winter Music Conference.

Besides performing Glowinthedark gives DJ/producer seminars at schools and events like Dance Fair and the Amsterdam dance event.

Lightstate 

Glowinthedark has their own international radio show, Lightstate. The hour-long radio show has theme tracks and a weekly changing guest mix. Lightstate is a part of the weekend schedule of Dutch radio station SLAM!FM, the Tokyo based radio station Block.FM, Spanish radio stations Mortal FM and Fun Radio and Lightstate is also aired in Sri Lanka on Sun FM.

Discography

Singles

Remixes

Co-productions

References

External links
 
 GLOWINTHEDARK on IMD Management
 Soundcloud.com

Living people
1980s births
Dutch DJs
Dubstep musicians
Remixers
Dutch dance music groups
Dutch musical duos